The American Society for Nondestructive Testing, Inc. or ASNT is a technical society for nondestructive testing (NDT) professionals. ASNT evolved from The American Industrial Radium and X-ray Society which was founded in 1941. Its headquarters is located in Columbus, Ohio, and there are 70 local sections in the United States and 14 local sections in other countries.

The organization
ASNT is a nonprofit organization, which is governed by the Board of Directors and the national officers.  There are four councils within ASNT:

 Technical and Education
 Research 
 Section Operations
 Certification

ASNT publishes and maintains an important standard, SNT-TC-1A, which, with the addition of Codes of Practice ANSI/ASNT CP-189 and ANSI/ASNT CP-105, covers all aspects of qualification and certification of NDT personnel. SNT-TC-1A specifies an employer based certification scheme for ASNT NDT Level I and ASNT NDT Level II Certification Program personnel, which is extensively used worldwide, in countries not enforcing ISO 9712 such as the European Union or Canada.  The ASNT Central Certification Program (ACCP) is a fully accredited certification scheme that specifically complies with the ISO 9712 Standard.

Activities
ASNT manages a central certification scheme for ASNT NDT Level III professionals.

The Conference Department of ASNT regularly organizes two (ASNT Research Symposium, and ASNT Annual Conference) major scientific and technical conferences around March and October each year.

See also
Materials Evaluation (journal)

References

Key ASNT publications

 Recommended Practice No. SNT-TC-1A: Personnel Qualification and Certification in Nondestructive Testing (2011)
 ANSI/ASNT CP-189: ASNT Standard for Qualification and Certification of Nondestructive Testing Personnel (2011)
 ANSI/ASNT CP-105: ASNT Standard Topical Outlines for Qualification of Nondestructive Testing Personnel (2011)

External links
 ASNT−American Society for Nondestructive Testing website

Nondestructive testing
Engineering societies based in the United States
International organizations based in the Americas
Organizations established in 1941
1941 establishments in the United States
Organizations based in Columbus, Ohio